A.T.M. ¡A toda máquina! or ¡A toda máquina! ( Full Speed Ahead) is a 1951 Mexican comedy film directed by Ismael Rodríguez and starring Pedro Infante, Luis Aguilar and Aurora Segura. It was followed by a sequel ¿Qué te ha dado esa mujer? the same year.

The plot follows two motorcycle traffic policemen (Infante and Aguilar) in Mexico City, who are both good friends and intense rivals, and features a number of songs sung by both stars.

Cast
 Pedro Infante as Pedro Chávez  
 Luis Aguilar as Luis Macías  
 Aurora Segura as Guillermina 
 Alma Delia Fuentes as Anita  
 Delorice Archer as the little American girl  
 Emma Rodríguez as Doña Angustias  
 Carlos Valadez as Tarcisio  
 Consuelo Pastor as María Luisa  
 Amelia Wilhelmy as the old lady motorist 
 Pedro de Urdimalas as the announcer  
 Ángel Infante as the commander  
 Salvador Quiroz as the general  
 Luis Leal Solares as the commander 
 Alfonso Carti as the police officer  
 Jorge Casanova as the scandalous man 
 José Chávez as Pépe’s minion  
 Manuel de la Vega as Pépe, the jealous boyfriend 
 Magda Donato as Mrs. Hayworth  
 Pedro Elviro as the begar  
 Ana María Hernández as the club patron  
 Rogelio 'Frijolitos' Jiménez Pons as Doña Angustias' son
 Myron Levine as the club patron  
 Blanca Marroquín as the ambulance nurse 
 Pepe Martínez as the majordomo  
 Héctor Mateos as the majordomo at the quinceañera  
 Francisco Pando as the guest  
 Carlos Rincón Gallardo as Angustias' husband
 Ismael Rodríguez as the man who hangs up the phone  
 Ángela Rodríguez as the passenger in Guillermina's car 
 Beatriz Saavedra as the passenger in Guillermina's car
 Salvador Terroba as Pépe’s minion  
 Manuel Trejo Morales as the ambulance doctor  
 Hilda Vera as guest

References

Bibliography 
 Juanita Heredia. Transnational Latina Narratives in the Twenty-first Century. Palgrave Macmillan, 2009.

External links 
 

1951 films
1951 comedy films
Mexican comedy films
1950s Spanish-language films
Films directed by Ismael Rodríguez
Films set in Mexico City
Mexican black-and-white films
1950s Mexican films